The Leicester South West by-election of 2 November 1967 was held after the resignation of Labour MP (MP) Herbert Bowden.

The seat was seen as safe, having been won by Labour at the 1966 United Kingdom general election by over 5,500 votes However, like many other by-elections during this Parliament, the Labour Party saw a steep decline in its support and the Conservative candidate Thomas Boardman gained the seat with a majority of nearly 4,000 votes.

Candidates
The Conservatives adopted Thomas Boardman, a Lieutenant-Colonel who had served in the Second World War.
Neville Sandelson for Labour was a barrister and one time member of the London County Council
The local Liberal Party association nominated Colin Beech

Result of the previous general election

Result of the by-election

References

1967 in England
Elections in Leicester
1967 elections in the United Kingdom
By-elections to the Parliament of the United Kingdom in Leicestershire constituencies
1960s in Leicestershire
November 1967 events in the United Kingdom
20th century in Leicester